The 1950 South American Basketball Championship for Women was the 3rd edition of this regional tournament for women in South America. It was held in Lima, Peru and won by Chile. Six teams competed.

Final rankings

Results

Each team played the other teams once, for a total of five games played by each team.

Tiebreaker
In this case, to break the tie for the first place, a final match was scheduled between Chile and Argentina.

External links
FIBA Archive

F
B
Women's basketball in Peru
South American Basketball Championship for Women
Sports competitions in Lima
South American Basketball Championship for Women
1950s in Lima
South American Basketball Championship for Women